Beersville is a small community in Weldford Parish located 3.92 km SSE of Fords Mills and was named for John A. Beers (1860–1951) The community had a Post Office from 1900 to 1965 and in 1904 Beersville was a station on the Intercolonial Railway and a farming settlement with 1 post office, 1 store, 1 sawmill, 1 church and a population of 100. At one point it was a part of Emerson, at another, Emerson was a separate community but the place name was removed and the name is now honoured in the area by a road through Beersville called Emerson Road. Emerson was possibly named for Henry Robert Emerson (1853–1914), the Premier of New Brunswick from 1897 to 1900 and in 1904 Emerson was a farming settlement with 1 post office.  Beersville is located on Route 465.

Beersville has a church (St. James Presbyterian Church), a local community center and was home of the local Fire Department for many years before moving to nearby Fords Mills.  
A monument was erected on the Irving family homestead adjacent to the St. James Presbyterian Church cemetery.

History

Notable people

See also
List of communities in New Brunswick

References

Settlements in New Brunswick
Communities in Kent County, New Brunswick